Year 112 (CXII) was a leap year starting on Thursday (link will display the full calendar) of the Julian calendar. At the time, it was known as the Year of the Consulship of Traianus and Cornelius (or, less frequently, year 865 Ab urbe condita). The denomination 112 for this year has been used since the early medieval period, when the Anno Domini calendar era became the prevalent method in Europe for naming years.

Events 
<onlyinclude>

By place

Roman Empire 
 Emperor Trajan and Titus Sextius Cornelius Africanus become Roman consuls.
 August 29 – Salonia Matidia receives the title of Augusta upon the death of Marciana.
 Publius Cornelius Tacitus becomes governor of the Roman province of Asia.
 Hadrian succeeds Gaius Julius Cassius Steirieus as archon of Athens.
 Tacitus is named proconsul of the Roman province of Asia (112–113).

Asia 
 King Jima succeeds Pasa as ruler of the Korean kingdom of Silla.

Births

Deaths 
 Beatus of Lungern, Swiss monk and hermit
 Pasa (the Great), Korean ruler of Silla

References